Uwern Jong is a British Asian entrepreneur, journalist, editor and inclusive-tourism advocate. Jong co-founded OutThere magazine in 2010. Jong is also founder of Southeast Asia’s first LGBTQ+ travel symposium for the Tourism Authority of Thailand and through OutThere, developed Thailand's “Go Thai Be Free” LGBTQ travel campaign and website, as part as the government’s strategy to attract more diverse tourists to the country. Jong is credited as an Editor who has been a "material player in the advancement of LGBTQ+ rights.” He is an inclusive tourism advocate, promoting a more diverse media landscape and better recruitment and representation in the travel industry.

Career 
Jong was one of the original founders of integrated marketing and communications agency, Intelligent Marketing where he created marketing campaigns targeting the LGBTQ+ market 

Jong continues to campaign for inclusive tourism for the LGBTQ+ community and is board-member of the International LGBTQ+ Travel Association.

Personal life 
Jong is openly gay. He is trustee of the charity Sport Allies that works to combat homophobia in sport.

Awards and recognitions 
 Walpole Power List 2022 – "The 50 most influential people in British Luxury."
 TTG Travel Industry Awards 2022 – “LGBT+ Trailblazer of the year.”
 Attitude 101, 2021 – "10 LGBTQ trailblazers breaking barriers in the travel industry."
 Campaign Magazine's "Campaign Publishing Awards" for Editorial Leader of the Year – Consumer Publishing, 2020.
 GNETWORK360 Masterclass Award for Excellence in Journalism 2020 that recognises the contribution of international journalists for their work in promoting Argentina as an inclusive destination for travellers.
 The United States Travel and Tourism Administration's IPW Award 2017 that recognises travel journalists who have made a significant contribution to the promotion of the United States of America as a travel destination, worldwide.

References 

British magazine editors
Year of birth missing (living people)
Living people